The King's Way is a novel by the French author Françoise Chandernagor first published in 1981. It is the story of Françoise d'Aubigné, marquise de Maintenon, who in the 17th century was almost the queen of France. It follows her destiny, from her birth in a prison in Niort and her poor childhood, to a marriage to a disabled poet, and her life in the court of Louis XIV, king of France, where she became his companion and finally his wife.

The film
The TV-film with the same title was released in French in 1996. It has a  playtime of 4 hours.
Director: Nina Companéez
Writers: Françoise Chandernagor (novel), Nina Companéez
Stars: Dominique Blanc, Mauricio Buraglia and Didier Sandre

References

External links
Françoise Chandernagor's official site 

1981 French novels
French historical novels
French novels adapted into television shows
French novels adapted into films
Novels set in Early Modern France
Novels set in the 17th century